Ian Cameron Swales (born 5 April 1953) is a British Liberal Democrat politician. He was the Member of Parliament for the constituency of Redcar in England. Swales took Redcar from Labour incumbent Vera Baird for the Liberal Democrats at the 2010 general election, with a 21.8% swing. Swales added over 10,000 votes to his 2005 general election total. This was the biggest swing against any Labour candidate in the election and was also biggest majority overcome by any Liberal Democrat, until the 2022 Tiverton and Honiton by-election. He stood down at the 2015 general election.

Early life
Ian Swales is the son of Harry Swales and Elizabeth Adamson Doig. Through his Scottish mother he is a first cousin (1R) of Peter Doig, Labour MP for Dundee West from 1963 to 1979. Swales was born in Leeds and grew up in Harrogate; his mother died when he was eight years old. Educated at Woodlands Junior School, he became Head Boy and then won a County Council funded scholarship to Ashville College, Harrogate. Following a chemical engineering degree at University of Manchester Institute of Science and Technology, where he met his wife, Pat, a Durham miner's daughter, he joined Yorkshire Electricity and qualified as an accountant in 1977. He moved to Teesside in 1978 to join large chemical company ICI and settled in Redcar. From 1983 to 1986, he worked for ICI in Brussels.

Political career

Swales joined the SDP when it was founded in 1981, and was a member of the first Cleveland County Committee for the SDP. He contested the 2005 general election in the Redcar Constituency and moved the Liberal Democrats (the successor party to the SDP) from third to second place with a positive swing against both the Labour and Conservative parties.

In 2010, Swales achieved a 21.8% swing against Labour in winning the Redcar seat. He made his maiden speech in Parliament on 7 June 2010. For his role in helping to get Redcar steel works restarted Swales was Total Politics MP of the month for April 2011 and Dods constituency MP of the year finalist for 2011. During his time in Parliament, Swales was an active member of many All Party Parliamentary Groups including Chair of the APPG for the Chemical Industry  and Vice-Chair of the APPGs for Steel and Energy Intensive Industries. In May 2014, Swales was appointed to the taskforce group for electrification of rail in the north by the Secretary of State for Transport, Patrick McLoughlin, MP.

Shortly after the 2010 election, Swales became an active member of the Public Accounts Committee, which sits twice a week and scrutinises all public expenditure. In June 2014, Swales resigned from the Committee, citing frontbench commitments. He also sat on the Welfare Reform and Finance Bill Committees, and campaigned against tax avoidance. After his prominent role on the Public Accounts Committee, Swales was promoted to Liberal Democrat Treasury Spokesman.

In July 2014, Swales announced that he was standing down as an MP at the 2015 general election, for "personal reasons". In January 2015, he was made Parliamentary Private Secretary to Vince Cable, who at the time was Secretary of State for Business, Innovation and Skills.

In October 2021, after the murder of David Amess, Swales revealed that he stood down because of a 2014 incident in which two men entered his constituency office claiming to know where he lived and threatening to kill him.

After Parliament

Following his retirement from Parliament, Swales continued to participate in local industry issues. He advised the management of Redcar steel works and in August 2015 joined the Board, becoming Chair, of the Northeast of England Process Industry Cluster (NEPIC), the body that represents companies in the chemical, pharmaceutical, polymer, renewable energy and materials, steel and biotechnology process industries in North-East England.
In 2016 he received an Honorary Fellowship from the Institute of Chemical Engineers (FIChemE) for his contributions to the chemical industry.

Swales was the founding Chair of mental health charity The Link Tees Valley Ltd. and remains as a Director. He is Chair of the grant giving Sirius Minerals Foundation Ltd. and a Director of Redcar Racecourse Ltd.

Personal life
In his spare time, Swales helps local organisations and campaigns on local issues. He was active in Redcar Swimming Club and after the closure of the old pool campaigned for a new one. Swales was on the Committee of Coatham Memorial Hall for many years.

Swales is a humanist, and in 2015 was made an honorary life member of Humanists UK for his work in Parliament. He and his wife Pat have three children and seven grandchildren, three boys and four girls. His interests include travel, reading, cooking, playing bridge, walking and genealogy.

References

External links

Living people
Liberal Democrats (UK) MPs for English constituencies
UK MPs 2010–2015
1953 births
People educated at Ashville College
Alumni of the University of Manchester
Fellows of the Association of Chartered Certified Accountants
Social Democratic Party (UK) politicians
People from Harrogate